Róger Mauricio Torres Hoya, known as Róger Torres (born 13 July 1991) is a Colombian professional footballer who plays as an attacking midfielder for Peruvian club Alianza Atlético.

Career
Torres played for Envigado's youth team before moving to Alianza Petrolera of the Colombian second division. He debuted in February 2008, scoring one goal during that season. On July 16, 2009, he signed with América de Cali of the first division. He started all 15 games that he took part in, debuting against Santa Fe.

Torres then joined Major League Soccer expansion team Philadelphia Union for their preseason leading up to their inaugural season in MLS, and was acquired on loan from América after impressing during his time there.

On April 10, 2010, Torres recorded the first ever assist for the expansion side Philadelphia Union. He did so with a cross put away by Sébastien Le Toux in the fourth minute of play. He scored his first goal for Union almost exactly a year later, on April 9, 2011, just a minute after coming on as a substitute in a game against the New York Red Bulls. Torres won the AT&T Goal of the Week in week 20 of the 2011 season with his stoppage time goal against the Colorado Rapids in 2011.

On January 31, 2012, Torres completed a permanent transfer from América de Cali to Philadelphia Union.

Torres left Philadelphia following the 2013 season.

In January 2019, Torres joined Atlético Junior.

Career statistics

References

External links
 Philadelphia Union profile

1991 births
Living people
Colombian footballers
Association football midfielders
Alianza Petrolera players
América de Cali footballers
Philadelphia Union players
Atlético Nacional footballers
La Equidad footballers
Atlético Junior footballers
Independiente Santa Fe footballers
Atlético Bucaramanga footballers
FC Ilves players
Alianza Atlético footballers
Categoría Primera A players
Categoría Primera B players
Major League Soccer players
Veikkausliiga players
Colombian expatriate footballers
Colombian expatriate sportspeople in the United States
Expatriate soccer players in the United States
Colombian expatriate sportspeople in Finland
Expatriate footballers in Finland
Colombian expatriate sportspeople in Peru
Expatriate footballers in Peru
Sportspeople from Santander Department